The 2007 Asian Acrobatic Gymnastics Championships were the sixth edition of the Asian Acrobatic Gymnastics Championships, and were held in Almaty, Kazakhstan, from July 4 to July 9, 2007.

Participating nations

Medal summary

References

A
Asian Gymnastics Championships
International gymnastics competitions hosted by Kazakhstan
2007 in Kazakhstani sport